The Old Mosque of Moscow (Moskovskaya istoricheskaya mechet) was built in 1823 to replace an earlier private mosque that had been destroyed by the 1812 fire. Its location is Bolshaya Tatarskaya Street in Zamoskvorechye, a neighbourhood formerly settled by the Tatars.

The land was owned by a Tatar merchant, Nasarbai Hashalov. The tsarist authorities permitted the construction of a "Muslim house of prayer" on condition that it would not be called a mosque and that its facade would not differ significantly from neighbouring houses. The cupola and minaret were added in 1880. The madrasa dates from 1915.

The mosque was shut down by the Soviets in 1939 and the minaret was demolished in 1967. The last imam was purged in 1963 and later shot. Worship in the mosque did not resume until 1993. The minaret has been rebuilt in 1992.

See also
Islam in Russia
List of mosques in Russia
List of mosques in Europe

References

External links 

 

Mosques in Moscow
1823 establishments in the Russian Empire
19th-century mosques
Tatar culture
Mosques completed in 1823
Closed mosques in the Soviet Union
Mosques in Russia
Mosques in Europe
Cultural heritage monuments in Moscow